Hardscrabble is an unincorporated community in Highland County, Virginia, United States. The community is situated along the Straight Fork in the Alleghany Valley.

References

Unincorporated communities in Highland County, Virginia
Unincorporated communities in Virginia